Chingrakhali Union is an Union Parishad under Morrelganj Upazila of Bagerhat District in the division of Khulna, Bangladesh. It has an area of 17.28 km2 (6.67 sq mi) and a population of 29,001.

References

Unions of Morrelganj Upazila
Unions of Bagerhat District
Unions of Khulna Division